Enonjärvi is a rather small lake of Finland in northern Central Finland, in Karstula and Kannonkoski municipalities. It belongs to Kymijoki main catchment area. The outflow of water is via Pajusalmi to lake Kannonselkä.

References

See also
List of lakes in Finland

Landforms of Central Finland
Lakes of Kannonkoski
Lakes of Karstula